The 2015 AFC Asian Cup qualification was a qualification process organized by the AFC to determine the participating teams for the 2015 AFC Asian Cup. The 2015 AFC Asian Cup, hosted by Australia, featured 16 teams.

In the initial scheme, ten places were determined by qualification matches, while six places were reserved for the following:
Hosts (Australia)
Top three finishers in the 2011 AFC Asian Cup (Japan, Australia, and South Korea)
Winners of the 2012 AFC Challenge Cup (North Korea)
Winners of the 2014 AFC Challenge Cup (Palestine)
As the host nation Australia also finished as runners-up in the 2011 AFC Asian Cup, the initial 6 automatic qualification spots were reduced to 5, with a total of 11 spots eventually determined by the qualification matches, in which 20 AFC members compete.

Qualified teams

Qualification process
The preliminary draw was held in Melbourne on 9 October 2012, 18:00 UTC+11. The twenty teams involved in the qualifiers were drawn into five groups of four teams each, with each group containing one team from each of the following seeding pots. Each group was played on a home-and-away round-robin basis. The top two teams from each group and the best third-placed team from among all the groups qualified for the finals.

The following teams did not enter the main qualifying draw, as categorized as "emerging countries" they compete separately. The teams were eligible to qualify for the 2015 Asian Cup by winning either the 2012 AFC Challenge Cup or the 2014 AFC Challenge Cup.

 † ‡
 † ‡
 †
 ‡
 † ‡
 † ‡
 ‡
 † ‡
 † ‡
 † ‡
 † ‡
 † ‡
 † ‡
 † ‡
 † ‡
 †
 ‡
 † ‡
 † ‡
 † ‡
 † ‡
 † ‡

 † ‡

† Entrants to 2012 AFC Challenge Cup qualification
‡ Entrants to 2014 AFC Challenge Cup qualification

Schedule
The following matchdays were assigned by the AFC for 2015 AFC Asian Cup qualification. As 15 and 19 November 2013 were also the dates of the inter-confederation playoffs for the 2014 FIFA World Cup, a number of alternative matchdays were allocated.

Groups

Tiebreakers
In each group, the teams were ranked according to points (3 points for a win, 1 point for a tie, 0 points for a loss) and tie breakers were in the following order:
Greater number of points obtained in group matches between the teams concerned
Goal difference resulting from group matches between the teams concerned
Greater number of goals scored in group matches between the teams concerned (away goals not applicable)
Goal difference in all group matches
Greater number of goals scored in all group matches
Penalty shoot-out if only two teams were involved and they were both on the field of play
Drawing of lots

Group A

Group B

Group C

Group D

Group E

Ranking of third-placed teams
To determine the best third-placed team, the following criteria were used:
Number of points obtained in the group matches
Goal difference in the group matches
Greater number of goals scored in the group matches
Fewer points calculated according to the number of yellow and red cards received in the group matches (1 point for each yellow card, 3 points for each red card as a consequence of two yellow cards, 3 points for each direct red card, 4 points for each yellow card followed by a direct red card)
Drawing of lots

Goalscorers
5 goals

 Reza Ghoochannejhad
 Ali Mabkhout

4 goals

 Javad Nekounam
 Younis Mahmoud
 Khalfan Ibrahim

3 goals

 Faouzi Aaish
 Tha'er Bawab
 Ahmad Hayel
 Yousef Nasser
 Hassan Maatouk
 Walid Abbas
 Ahmed Khalil
 Igor Sergeev

2 goals

 Boaz Solossa
 Ashkan Dejagah
 Fahad Awadh
 Hassan Chaito
 Mohammed Ghaddar
 Mohamad Haidar
 Eid Al-Farsi
 Qasim Said
 Sebastián Soria
 Fahad Al-Muwallad
 Yousef Al-Salem
 Nasser Al-Shamrani
 Khairul Amri
 Thitipan Puangchan
 Ismail Al Hammadi
 Habib Fardan
 Sardor Rashidov
 Vokhid Shodiev
 Huỳnh Quốc Anh
 Nguyễn Trọng Hoàng

1 goal

 Ismail Abdul-Latif
 Saad Al Amer
 Abdulla Saleh
 Mohamed Salmeen
 Wu Lei
 Wu Xi
 Yu Dabao
 Zhang Xizhe
 Zhao Xuri
 Chan Wai Ho
 Lo Kwan Yee
 Karim Ansarifard
 Jalal Hosseini
 Alireza Jahanbakhsh
 Yaghoub Karimi
 Amir Hossein Sadeghi
 Masoud Shojaei
 Ali Adnan
 Hammadi Ahmad
 Karrar Jassim
 Mossab Al-Laham
 Yusuf Al-Rawashdeh
 Khalil Bani Attiah
 Abdallah Deeb
 Fahad Al-Rashidi
 Waleed Ali
 Hamad Aman
 Hussain Fadel
 Abbas Ali Atwi
 Roda Antar
 Soony Saad
 Azamuddin Akil
 Mohd Amri Yahyah
 Ahmad Fakri Saarani
 Khyril Muhymeen
 Norshahrul Idlan Talaha
 Sami Al-Hasani
 Amad Al Hosni
 Abdulaziz Al-Muqbali
 Ali Afif
 Yusef Ahmed
 Abdulkarim Al-Ali
 Hassan Al-Haydos
 Abdelkarim Hassan
 Jeddo
 Mohammed Kasola
 Taisir Al-Jassim
 Osama Hawsawi
 Naif Hazazi
 Shahril Ishak
 Gabriel Quak
 Ahmad Al Douni
 Abdul Fattah Al Agha
 Oday Jafal
 Omar Khribin
 Sanharib Malki
 Raja Rafe
 Burhan Sahyouni
 Adisak Kraisorn
 Chanathip Songkrasin
 Mongkol Tossakrai
 Teerasil Dangda
 Teeratep Winothai
 Omar Abdulrahman
 Ismail Matar
 Salem Saleh
 Odil Ahmedov
 Shohruh Gadoev
 Nguyễn Anh Đức
 Ayman Al-Hagri
 Mohammed Al-Sarori
 Ala'a Al-Sasi

Own goals

 Hussain Fadel (playing against Iran)
 Theeraton Bunmathan (playing against Kuwait)
 Âu Văn Hoàn (playing against Uzbekistan)

Notes

References

External links
 (Official website) 
AFC Asian Cup, the-AFC.com

Qualification
2015
2013 in Asian football
2014 in Asian football